SGSD may refer to:

Succinylglutamate-semialdehyde dehydrogenase, an enzyme in the oxidoreductase family
Southeastern Greene School District, in Greene County, Pennsylvania